

In the early 1940s, Erich Bachem, Fieseler's Aircraft's technical manager, developed two designs for a rocket-launched fighter that could reach high altitudes quicker than conventional fighters.

Design One

Design one involved a straight-winged jet fighter powered by two Jumo 004 jet engines.  It would be launched upright by liquid-fuel rockets. After attaining an altitude of 3660 meters, the rocket would burn out, disconnect and return to earth via parachute for re-use.  The fighter would then engage Allied bombers before landing as a conventional airplane.

See also
 Bachem Ba 349 Natter, a similar point-defense interceptor designed by Erich Bachem which achieved test flights (1945)

References

Abandoned military aircraft projects of Germany
Rocket-powered aircraft
Fi 166
Low-wing aircraft